Improphantes is a genus of  dwarf spiders that was first described by Michael I. Saaristo & A. V. Tanasevitch in 1996.

Species
 it contains twenty species, found in Algeria, China, Cyprus, Finland, France, Germany, Israel, Japan, Kazakhstan, Kenya, Kyrgyzstan, Russia, Spain, Sweden, Tajikistan, and Turkey:
Improphantes biconicus (Tanasevitch, 1992) – Russia (Far East), Japan
Improphantes breviscapus Tanasevitch, 2013 – Israel
Improphantes complicatus (Emerton, 1882) – North America, Europe, Russia (Europe to Far East)
Improphantes contus Tanasevitch & Piterkina, 2007 – Kazakhstan
Improphantes cypriot Tanasevitch, 2011 – Cyprus
Improphantes decolor (Westring, 1861) – Europe, North Africa
Improphantes djazairi (Bosmans, 1985) – Algeria
Improphantes falcatus (Bosmans, 1979) – Kenya
Improphantes flexilis (Tanasevitch, 1986) – Russia (Middle Siberia to Far East)
Improphantes furcabilis (Wunderlich, 1987) – Canary Is.
Improphantes geniculatus (Kulczyński, 1898) – Germany to Russia (West Siberia)
Improphantes holmi (Kronestedt, 1975) – Sweden, Finland, Russia (Urals)
Improphantes huberti (Wunderlich, 1980) – France (Corsica)
Improphantes improbulus (Simon, 1929) (type) – Europe, Caucasus, Central Asia (Russia, Kazakhstan), China
Improphantes mauensis (Caporiacco, 1949) – Kenya
Improphantes multidentatus (Wunderlich, 1987) – Canary Is.
Improphantes nitidus (Thorell, 1875) – Europe
Improphantes pamiricus (Tanasevitch, 1989) – Tajikistan
Improphantes potanini (Tanasevitch, 1989) – Kyrgyzstan
Improphantes turok Tanasevitch, 2011 – Turkey

See also
 List of Linyphiidae species (I–P)

References

Araneomorphae genera
Linyphiidae
Spiders of Africa
Spiders of Asia